Yuen Lung is one of the 39 constituencies in the Yuen Long District of Hong Kong.

The constituency returns one district councillor to the Yuen Long District Council, with an election every four years.

Yuen Lung constituency is loosely based on southeastern part of Yuen Long Town, covering Sun Yuen Long Centre and YOHO Town with estimated population of 13,959.

Councillors represented

Election results

2010s

Notes

References

Yuen Long Town
Constituencies of Hong Kong
Constituencies of Yuen Long District Council
2015 establishments in Hong Kong
Constituencies established in 2015